The Star of Adam is an oval-shaped blue star sapphire, currently the largest star sapphire in the world. It weighs . Prior to its discovery, the Black Star of Queensland, weighing , was the largest star sapphire gem in the world.

Description
The blue-colored gemstone has a six-pointed star-shaped reflection or distinctive mark in the center.

This very large star sapphire was discovered in Ratnapura (known by the nickname "City of Gems"), in southern Sri Lanka, in August 2015. It was named "The Star of Adam" by the current owner, as a reference to Muslim beliefs that Adam arrived in Sri Lanka and lived on Adam's Peak after leaving the Garden of Eden.

The owner of the gem, preferring anonymity, told the BBC World Service's Newsday radio programme that "The moment I saw it, I decided to buy", and added "this was not a piece of jewellery but an exhibition piece".

However, size means little when it comes to fine gems. Corundum crystals weighing tens of kilograms have been unearthed. A leading gem and jewelry dealer in the country confirmed to the BBC that it was the largest blue star sapphire in the world. In an interview to BBC Earth, Simon Redfern, mineral scientist from the University of Cambridge, said "the stone could have formed within the granite rocks of Sri Lanka's highlands. It was able to grow so big because of constant but slow change in temperatures and pressures within the rocks for millions of years".

Later, the gemstone was valued at over $300 million, but this valuation has been disputed. Bangkok-based Lotus Gemology maintains an updated listing of world auction records of ruby, sapphire and spinel. As of November 2019, no sapphire has ever sold at auction for more than $17,295,796.

See also 
Serendipity Sapphire
List of individual gemstones
List of sapphires by size

References

External links 
 The world's biggest blue sapphire? Owner's interview @ Newsday radio programme
 World's largest blue star sapphire found – Worth $300 million Video of the gemstone with interview
 Gem, Diamond and Jewellery Exporters from Sri Lanka

Individual sapphires
Gems of Sri Lanka